The Krasnodar bus bombing (Russian language: Взрыв автобуса в Краснодаре) was a bombing that occurred on a bus in Krasnodar, June 14, 1971, when a homemade suitcase bomb placed near the gas tank by mentally ill Peter Volynsky exploded, killing 10 persons and wounding 20–90 others.

Attack 
Around 8:20 a.m. Volynsky went into the bus with suitcase bomb and placed the explosive near the gas tank. After the bus pulled off from the stop, Volynsky claimed to be sick and told the driver to release him urgently (according to another version, he went out at the next stop).

The explosion occurred at about 8:30 a.m. in Turgenev Street. The blast reportedly threw the bus into the air, Five people died on the spot, while another five subsequently died in the hospital. Many others were injured. The bomb was stuffed with metal balls, nails and bearings, which struck the gas tank of the bus, as a result of which it caught fire. The driver, who was not seriously injured, managed to open the jammed doors and smash the window with the mounting, but the people who suffered severe injuries could not get out of the cabin and were burned in it. Surviving passengers said that they saw a man with a cap with a large black suitcase, in addition, one of the found parts was a piece of fire extinguisher.

Aftermath 
The KGB department found Volynsky two days after the bombing. In the bomber's apartment gas cylinders, a box, gunpowder, disassembled bearings and a nichrome wire were found, enough to destroy a five-storey house. And a Napoleon portrait with the inscription "i can do anything". Volynsky carefully calculated the cost of manufacturing explosive devices, as a result of which investigators managed to establish that the exploded bomb cost him only 40 rubles.

While interrogated, they asked for Volynsky what prompted him to commit the crime, Volynsky simply said: "I hate people."

Forensic psychiatrists examination recognized Volynsky as insane and sent him to a compulsory treatment in a psychiatric hospital of a closed type in Novy Abisnky District, Krasnodar Krai by a court decision where the bomber is still held at the hospital.

See also 

Timeline of Krasnodar

References

Mass murder in 1971
20th-century mass murder in Russia
Terrorist incidents in Russia
Improvised explosive device bombings in Russia
Krasnodar
1971 in Russia
1971 in the Soviet Union
Terrorist incidents in the Soviet Union
Terrorist incidents in the Soviet Union in the 1970s
Terrorist incidents in Europe in 1971
Terrorist incidents in Asia in 1971
1971 crimes in Russia
1971 murders in Europe 
1970s murders in Russia	
1971 murders in the Soviet Union